The Wright Axcess-Ultralow was a low-floor single-decker bus body built on the Scania L113CRL chassis by Wrightbus between 1995 and 1998.

History
The Wright Axcess-Ultralow was introduced in 1995 as a replacement for the Wright Endurance and Wright Pathfinder. Of the 330 produced, FirstGroup purchased 244, North Western 34 and Merseybus 20.

The Axcess-Ultralow was succeeded by the Axcess-Floline in 1998 on the Scania L94UB chassis.

One has been preserved by the North West Vehicle Restoration Trust, Liverpool.

References

External links

Low-floor buses
Vehicles introduced in 1995
Axcess-Ultralow